The Penex process is a continuous catalytic process used in the refining of crude oil.  It isomerizes light straight run naphtha (C5/C6) into higher-octane, branched C5/C6 molecules. It also reduces the concentration of benzene in the gasoline pool. It was first used commercially in 1958.
Ideally, the isomerization catalyst converts normal pentane (nC5) to isopentane (iC5) and normal hexane (nC6) to 2,2- and 2,3-dimethylbutane. The thermodynamic equilibrium is more favorable at low temperature.

The Penex process uses fixed-bed catalysts containing chlorides.  A single pass of feedstock with an octane rating of 50-60 through such a bed typically produces an end product rated at 82-86.  If the feedstock is subsequently passed through a DIH (deisohexanizer) column, the end product typically has an octane rating of 87-90.5.  If the feedstock is subsequently passed through a Molex-technology column, the end product typically has an octane rating of 88-91.  If the feedstock is first passed through a DIP (deisopentanizer) column to remove iso-pentanes, then through the Penex bed, and subsequently through the DIH column, the end product typically has an octane rating of 91-93.

The Penex Process is licensed by the UOP corporation and currently utilized at more than 120 units at petroleum refineries and natural gas liquids plants throughout the world.

References

External links
 UOP's Website on C5/C6 Penex Process

Chemical processes
Oil refining